The 2019 Balearic Island Council elections were held on Sunday, 26 May 2019, to elect the 11th Island Councils of Mallorca and Menorca and the 4th Island Councils of Formentera and Ibiza. All 76 seats in the four Island Councils were up for election. The elections were held simultaneously with regional elections in twelve autonomous communities and local elections all throughout Spain, as well as the 2019 European Parliament election.

Opinion polls

Island Council control
The following table lists party control in the Island Councils. Gains for a party are displayed with the cell's background shaded in that party's colour.

Islands

Formentera

Ibiza

Mallorca

Menorca

See also
2019 Balearic regional election
Results breakdown of the 2019 Spanish local elections (Balearic Islands)

References

Balearic
2019